Romain Jacuzzi (born 16 December 1984 in Mont-de-Marsan, France) is a striker currently playing for French side Vendée Poiré sur Vie.

From 2002 to 2009, Jacuzzi played for Chamois Niortais, where he experienced one promotion and three relegations. During the 2006–2007 season, he had a loan spell at Championnat National side Vannes OC. On 1 July 2009 it was announced that Jacuzzi had signed a two-year contract with Laval.

References

External links
Profile at chamoisniortais.fr

1984 births
Living people
People from Mont-de-Marsan
French footballers
Association football forwards
Chamois Niortais F.C. players
Stade Lavallois players
Ligue 2 players
Vannes OC players
Vendée Poiré-sur-Vie Football players
Sportspeople from Landes (department)
Footballers from Nouvelle-Aquitaine